American Animals is a 2018 heist film written and directed by Bart Layton. Starring Evan Peters, Barry Keoghan, Blake Jenner, Jared Abrahamson, and Ann Dowd, it follows four college friends who plan a heist of their library. It tells the story of an actual heist which took place at Transylvania University in Lexington, Kentucky in 2004.

American Animals premiered at the 2018 Sundance Film Festival on January 19, 2018. The film was theatrically released in the United States on June 1, 2018, by The Orchard and MoviePass Ventures. Among other awards the film won the Junior Jury Award at The Montclair Film Festival. It received generally favorable reviews from critics, particularly for its screenplay, acting, use of unreliable narrators, and an unconventional storytelling structure that fused real-life characters and actors representing those characters.

Plot
Spencer Reinhard, an art student seeking excitement or tragedy for inspiration, is given a tour of Transylvania University library's rare-book collection; his eye is drawn to a rare first edition of John James Audubon's Birds of America. He and his friend Warren Lipka, a rebellious student on an athletic scholarship at the University of Kentucky, discuss the possibility of stealing it and other rare books.  They note that the collection is guarded by only one librarian, whom they believe they could easily overpower before stealing the books and escaping via the staff elevator. Warren travels to Amsterdam to meet black-market buyers who express interest, informing Spencer they could make millions. They later enlist the help of two friends: Eric Borsuk to provide logistics and Chas Allen as the getaway driver.

They make an appointment for a private viewing of the collection in order to gain access to the room, and arrive disguised as elderly businessmen; but they abort the heist when Warren sees multiple librarians in the room. Spencer wants to abandon the plan, but Warren persuades him and the others to try again the next day. Spencer acts as a lookout as Warren and Eric, without disguises, enter the library. Warren clumsily uses a stun gun on the librarian, making Eric help restrain her. They blunder to the exit, dropping The Birds of America, but escape with two books.

The group travels to Christie's auction house in New York to get the authentication of value Warren said the Dutch buyers required. Spencer is told he has to return the next day and leaves his cell phone number with an assistant. Chas berates Spencer for using a phone number that can be identified as his, and they return to Lexington with the books. Shortly after, Spencer realizes the police will also be able to trace the email address they used to make the appointments with Christie's and the library; the FBI eventually does, and they are arrested.

In documentary interviews with the real-life thieves filmed years after they are released from prison, they express regret. Spencer suspects Warren lied about going to Amsterdam in order to convince the others to partake in the heist. Eric and Chas now live in California as a writer and a fitness coach, respectively; Warren studies filmmaking in Philadelphia; and Spencer lives in Lexington as an artist.

Cast
 Evan Peters as Warren Lipka
 Barry Keoghan as Spencer Reinhard
 Blake Jenner as Chas Allen III
 Jared Abrahamson as Eric Borsuk
 Udo Kier as Mr. Van Der Hoek
 Ann Dowd as Betty Jean Gooch

Warren Lipka, Spencer Reinhard, Chas Allen, Eric Borsuk and Betty Jean Gooch all appear as themselves, along with Reinhard's parents, Allen's mother, Lipka's father, and one of the culprits' teachers.

Additionally, Gary Basaraba and Lara Grice portray Warren's parents, Jane McNeill portrays Spencer's mother, and Whitney Goin portrays Chas's mother. Wayne Duvall appears as Coach Bill Welton.

Production
Filming began in Charlotte, North Carolina, in February 2017. Many of the scenes were filmed on campus at Davidson College. The title comes from Eric Borsuk's memoir, which derives its name from a passage in On the Origin of Species, one of the books stolen by the gang, about animals dwelling in the cave systems of Kentucky; this quote is featured at the beginning of the film.

The film blurs elements of fiction and documentary, with the real-life versions of people depicted occasionally appearing alongside the actors in scripted scenes, and different versions of the same scene shown to reflect different accounts of events by the participants.

Soundtrack
The score and themes were composed by Anne Nikitin. Other songs include:

 Devil In Me - 22-20s
 Sound of da Police - KRS-One
 Free Animal - Foreign Air
 In Cold Blood - Alt-J Baauer remix 
 Hurdy Gurdy Man - Donovan
 A Little Less Conversation - JXL Radio Edit Remix
 Breathe and Stop - Q-Tip
 Red Balloon - Tim Hardin
 Bullet in the Head - Rage Against the Machine
 Definition - Black Star
 D.R.E.A.M. - Pharoahe Monch, Talib Kweli
 What It's Worth - Black Milk
 Ms. Fat Booty - Mos Def
 Here Come the Nice - Small Faces
 Carbona Not Glue – The Ramones
 Runnin' - The Pharcyde
 NY State of Mind - Nas
 Are You Satisfied? - Reignwolf
 Shook Ones (Part II) - Mobb Deep
 It Was a Good Day - Ice Cube
 They Reminisce Over You (T.R.O.Y.) - Pete Rock
 When I B On tha Mic - Rakim
 Shark Fin Blues - The Drones
 Vitamin C - Can
 New York Groove - Ace Frehley
 Peace Frog - The Doors
 I'm Alive - Johnny Thunder
 Who By Fire - Leonard Cohen
 Crucify Your Mind - Rodriguez

Release
It premiered at the 2018 Sundance Film Festival on January 19, 2018. The film's distribution rights were purchased by The Orchard and MoviePass Ventures for US$3 million. It was released on June 1, 2018.

Box office
In its opening weekend the film made US$140,629 from four theaters (an average of US$35,157), finishing 24th. According to their own reports, MoviePass members made up 25–35% of the film's opening weekend audience. Speaking about American Animals, as well as MoviePass Ventures' other film Gotti, one independent studio head told Deadline Hollywood: "It used to be in distribution, we'd all gossip whether a studio was buying tickets to their own movie to goose their opening. But in the case of MoviePass, there's no secret: They're literally buying the tickets to their own movie!"

Critical response
The website's critical consensus reads, "American Animals tangles with a number of weighty themes, but never at the expense of delivering a queasily compelling true crime thriller." On Metacritic, the film has a weighted average score of 68 out of 100, based on 40 critics, indicating "generally favorable reviews".

Awards and nominations 
Layton won the Special Jury Prize at the Deauville American Film Festival and won Best Screenplay from the Writers' Guild of Great Britain. At the British Independent Film Awards, American Animals won for Best Debut Screenwriter and Best Editing. At the Montclair Film Festival, the film won the Junior Jury Award. The film also received an Independent Spirit Award nomination for Best Editing.

References

External links
 
 

2018 crime drama films
2010s heist films
2018 films
American crime drama films
American heist films
British crime drama films
British heist films
Crime films based on actual events
2010s English-language films
Film4 Productions films
Films about books
Films about criminals
Films about robbery
Films set in libraries
Films set in universities and colleges
Films set in 2003
Films set in 2004
Films set in Kentucky
Films set in New York (state)
Films set in the Netherlands
Films shot in North Carolina
2018 independent films
The Orchard (company) films
Transylvania University
2010s American films
2010s British films